The Toyota Indy V8 is a 3-litre and 3.5-litre, naturally-aspirated racing engine, designed, developed and produced by Toyota Racing Development, for use in the IRL IndyCar Series, from 2003 to 2005.

Background
Toyota raced in the CART IndyCar World Series from 1996 to 2002. Its early years in the series were marked by struggles. Toyota-powered cars, campaigned by the All American Racers and PPI Motorsports teams, languished at the back of the grid, slow and unreliable. Toyota didn't even lead a lap until Alex Barron led 12 laps at the Vancouver street circuit in September 1998.

Toyota started seeing its fortunes improve in 1999 as Scott Pruett took pole position at the final race of the season at the California Speedway. The next year, Juan Pablo Montoya gave Toyota its first-ever CART win at the Milwaukee Mile, the first of 5 races won by Toyota-powered cars that year. Toyota-powered cars won six races in 2001. In 2002, Toyota's final year in the championship, it turned things around completely from its bleak debut. Toyota won the Manufacturer's championship, 10 races, and Cristiano da Matta rode Toyota power to the driver's championship, with Bruno Junqueira, also driving a Toyota-powered car, finished second.

Toyota moved to the IRL IndyCar Series in 2003 and provided direct factory support to former CART teams Team Penske and Target Chip Ganassi Racing as well as other teams. They were one of the top engines in their first year, winning the Indianapolis 500 with Gil de Ferran and the championship with Scott Dixon. However, 2004 and 2005 were not so kind and wins were few and far between. Following the 2005 IndyCar Series, Team Penske and Target Chip Ganassi Racing announced they would switch to Honda engines, leaving Toyota with no championship contenders. As a result of this and their intent to re-allocate resources for NASCAR, Toyota announced they would leave the IndyCar Series prematurely during the off-season.

Toyota still remained in the IndyCar Series as only a title sponsor for the Long Beach Grand Prix from 2009 until 2018 until it was replaced by Acura as official title sponsor of Long Beach Grand Prix from 2019 onwards.

References

External links

Toyota engines
Toyota in motorsport
IndyCar Series
V8 engines